Cuatro Caminos or 4 Caminos may refer to:

 Cuatro Caminos (Madrid), a Spanish ward
 Cuatro Caminos (Madrid Metro), a subway station serving the ward
 Cuatro Caminos (Murcia), a staging point on the GR 92 long-distance footpath
 Cuatro Caminos (album), a 2003 album by Café Tacuba
 Cuatro Caminos metro station (Naucalpan), a Mexico City Metro station
 Toreo de Cuatro Caminos, a former bullring and landmark in Naucalpan, State of Mexico
 Erreway: 4 caminos, a 2004 Argentine film